Mulder is a surname of two possible origins: Dutch and German.
 
It may be Dutch language occupational surname. It is an archaic Dutch word for "miller" (modern Dutch: molenaar). With 38,207 people in the Netherlands named Mulder, it was the 12th most common name there in 2007. In Belgium the form De Mulder ("the miller") is more common. 

The surname Mulder is also an occupational name of German origin, meaning "the maker of wooden bowls", from Middle High German mulde "bowl", "trough", or "tub" + the agent suffix -er.

Notable people with this name include:

Mulder
Agnes Mulder (born 1973), Dutch CDA politician
Allan Mulder (1928–2009), Australian Labor Party politician
Anne Mulder (born 1969), Dutch VVD politician
Anneke B. Mulder-Bakker (born 1940), Dutch historian
Anthonie Rouwenhorst Mulder (1848–1901), Dutch engineer and foreign advisor in Japan
Bob Mulder (born 1974), Dutch football midfielder
Boyito Mulder (born 1991), Dutch figure skater
Bret Mulder (born 1964), Australian cricket player
Catharina Mulder (1723–1798), Dutch orangist and riot leader
Charles Mulder (1897–?), Belgian bobsledder and ice hockey player
Connie Mulder (1925–1988), South African politician and minister
Corné Mulder (born 1950s), South African politician
Dave Mulder (born 1939), American (Iowa) politician
Dennis Mulder (born 1978), American mayor in Florida
Dikkie Mulder (born c. 1970s), South African rugby player 
Dustley Mulder (born 1985), Dutch-born Curaçaoan footballer
Edgar Mulder (born 1961), Dutch PVV politician
 (1832–1924), Dutch chemist, son of Gerardus Johannes
Eefke Mulder (born 1977), Dutch field hockey player
Elisabeth Mulder (1904–1987), Spanish writer, poet, translator, and journalist
Erwin Mulder (born 1989), Dutch football goalkeeper
Frank Mulder (born 1946), Dutch rower
Frederick Mulder (born 1943), Canadian-British art dealer and philanthropist
Frits Mulder (fl. 1928), Belgian competitive sailor
Gerardus Johannes Mulder (1802–1880), Dutch organic chemist
Gerben Mulder (born 1972), Dutch artist in the U.S. and Brazil
Gertjan Mulder (born 1975), Belgian-born Dutch rapper known as "Brainpower"
Gino Mulder (born 1987), Aruban footballer in the Netherlands
Grant R. Mulder (born 1940s), U.S. Air Force Major General
Hans Mulder (born 1987), Dutch football midfielder
Hans Mulder (scientist) (born 1969), Dutch computer scientist and enterprise engineer
Hendrik Mulder (born c. 1970s), South African rugby player
Herman Mulder (born c.1948), Dutch sustainable finance and investment writer
Ineke Mulder (born 1950), Dutch Labour Party politician
Jacob Mulder (born 1995), Australian-born Irish cricketer
 Jacob D. Mulder (1901–1965), Dutch surgeon and podiatrist who developed the physical exam Mulder's sign
Jan Mulder (footballer) (born 1945), Dutch football striker, writer, columnist, and TV personality
Jan Mulder (musician) (born 1963), Dutch-American pianist, composer, and orchestra conductor
Jan Mulder (politician) (born 1943), Dutch VVD politician
Japie Mulder (born 1969), South African rugby player
Jean Mulder (linguist) (born 1954), American linguist
John Mulder (1865–1941), American (Wisconsin) politician
Joseph Mulder (1658–1742), Dutch engraver and printmaker
Justin Mulder (born 1996), Dutch football midfielder
Karen Mulder (born 1970), Dutch supermodel and singer, sister of Saskia
 (1900–1988), Dutch architect and urban designer
Lau Mulder (1927–2006), Dutch field hockey goalkeeper
Leland E. Mulder (1925–1993), American (Wisconsin) politician
Machteld Mulder (born 1989), Dutch middle distance runner
Mandy Mulder (born 1987), Dutch competitive sailor
Mark Mulder (born 1977), American baseball pitcher
Maud Mulder (born 1981), Dutch pop singer and field hockey player
Mauricio Mulder (born 1956), Peruvian Aprista Party politician
Michel Mulder (born 1986), Dutch speed skater, twin brother of Ronald
Mychal Mulder (born 1994), Canadian basketball player
Pieter Mulder (born 1951), South African Freedom Front Plus politician
Raoul Mulder (born 1960s), Australian ornithologist and evolutionary ecologist
Richard Mulder (1938-2022), American physician and politician
Rick Mulder (born 1996), Dutch football midfielder
Ronald Mulder (born 1986), Dutch speed skater, twin brother of Michel
Samuel Israel Mulder (1792–1862), Dutch-Jewish educationist
Saskia Mulder (born 1973), Dutch film and television actress, sister of Karen
Scott Mulder (born 1992), Canadian track cyclist
Terry Mulder (born 1952), Australian (Victoria) politician
Teun Mulder (born 1981), Dutch track cyclist
Tony Mulder (born 1955), Dutch-born Australian (Tasmanian) politician and former police officer
Tyler Mulder (born 1987), American track and field athlete
Willem Mulder (born 1998), South African cricketer
Youri Mulder (born 1969), Dutch football striker and manager, son of the footballer Jan Mulder

De Mulder / Demulder
Françoise Demulder (1947–2008), French war photographer 
Frank De Mulder (born 1963), Belgian photographer
Frans De Mulder (1937–2001), Belgian racing cyclist
Geoff De Mulder (born 1930), English greyhound trainer
Gustave De Mulder (1888–?), Belgian rower
Marcel De Mulder (1928–2011), Belgian racing cyclist
Prosper De Mulder (1917–2012), English businessman who built the Prosper De Mulder Group
Robert Demulder (1900–1967), Belgian rower

Mulders
Jamilon Mülders (born 1976), German field hockey coach
Paul Mulders (born 1981), Filipino football midfielder
Rik Mulders, Dutch football player
Rob Mulders (1967–1998), Dutch road racing cyclist

Fictional characters
From The X-Files:
Fox Mulder, FBI Special Agent and lead character
Bill Mulder, Fox's legal father
Samantha Mulder, Fox's half sister
Teena Mulder, Fox's mother

See also 

 
Smulders
Molenaar
Muldaur
Moulder (disambiguation)
Molder (disambiguation)

References

Dutch-language surnames
Afrikaans-language surnames
Occupational surnames